Debatable is a BBC quiz show that has aired on BBC Two from 22 August 2016 to 2 June 2017 and is hosted by Patrick Kielty.

Format
One contestant and three celebrities play the game.

In the 30-minute episodes, two questions are asked in the first three rounds; in the 45-minute episodes, three are asked.

Round 1
Kielty runs a question with four possible answers past the contestant, sends it over to the team for discussion, and then asks the contestant for a final decision. Questions in this round are worth £200 each.

Round 2
Round 2 is a picture round, where the contestant is faced with three pictures which have to put in order. Again, Kielty will ask the contestant, he will then ask the celebrities and he will then ask the contestant again and must have an answer. £300 is earned for each correct order.

Round 3
Round 3 is a "Which of the following is true about…", and features three options. The contestant must pick one after having listened to the celebrities. Correct answers are worth £500.

Round 4
For the final round the contestant picks one celebrity, and between them they pick a category and are given 45 seconds to find three correct answers out of six. If the correct three answers are given, the contestant walks away with all the money they have won in the game, up to £2,000 (£3,000 in 45 minute episodes). If there is one or more wrong answer, the contestant leaves with nothing.

Panelists
The following have all appeared multiple times as one of the guest panelists on the show.

8 appearances
 Rick Edwards
 Ann Widdecombe

7 appearances
 Angela Rippon

6 appearances
 Susan Calman
 Russell Kane
 Sunetra Sarker

5 appearances
 Peter Jones
 June Sarpong
 Dan Walker

4 appearances
 Christopher Biggins
 Jennie Bond
 Michael Buerk
 Nigel Havers
 Konnie Huq
 Gethin Jones
 Carol Kirkwood
 Alice Levine
 Phil Tufnell

3 appearances
 Angellica Bell
 Ed Byrne
 Liz Carr
 Jonathan Edwards
 Tanni Grey-Thompson
 Rachel Johnson
 Sally Lindsay
 Tim Vine

2 appearances
 Akala
 Nitin Ganatra
 Germaine Greer
 Suzi Perry
 John Sergeant

The following have all made a single appearance as one of the guest panellists on the show:

 Matt Allwright
 Jennie Bond
 Hal Cruttenden
 Grace Dent
 Germaine Greer
 Alex James
 Naga Munchetty
 Esther Rantzen
 Angela Scanlon
 Nina Wadia
 Rav Wilding

Transmissions

References

External links
 
 
 

2016 British television series debuts
2017 British television series endings
2010s British game shows
BBC television game shows
English-language television shows
Television series by Hungry Bear Media